Senator Libby may refer to:

Charles Libby (1844–1915), Maine State Senate
Nate Libby (born 1985), Maine State Senate